West Virginia Route 891 is a  long east–west state highway located in Marshall County, West Virginia. The western terminus of the route is at U.S. Route 250 roughly three miles north of Cameron. The eastern terminus is at the Pennsylvania state line, where WV 891 continues east as Pennsylvania Route 21.

Route description
WV 891 begins at an intersection with US 250 north of Cameron and heads east. The very curvy route mainly serves as a connector to Pennsylvania Route 21, as the highway intersects no other state highways and doesn't run through any communities.

History
Until the late 1980s, the route was known as West Virginia Route 89. WV 89 continued west along present County Route 89 to WV 2 at Proctor.

Major intersections

References

891
Transportation in Marshall County, West Virginia